Ellowes Hall Sports College (formerly Ellowes Hall School) is a comprehensive secondary school and sixth form situated on Stickley Lane in Lower Gornal, Dudley, West Midlands, England.

It provides education for pupils aged 11 to 18 years.

History
It was built as a secondary modern school by Sedgley Urban District Council in 1964 near the Ellowes Hall stately home (which was demolished that year), to replace a smaller secondary school at nearby Redhall, but since 1966 has existed within the Metropolitan Borough of Dudley.

In September 1972, the age of pupils starting the school was increased to 12 in order to comply with the LEA's decision to increase the secondary school starting age.

In September 1975, the school's status changed to comprehensive and a sixth form was added, making it a 12–18 school.

However, the school was reorganised to an 11–16 comprehensive in September 1990 as most of the remaining sixth forms in the Dudley borough were replaced with expanded facilities at further education colleges.

In September 1993, the school became grant-maintained, only to return to Dudley LEA's control in 1998. By this date, a new classroom block and library had been constructed, and the main hall had been refurbished. A performing arts block was opened in 1999.

Just after the school became grant maintained, the governors seized the opportunity to restore sixth form facilities to the school and the new sixth form opened in September 1995.

In 2004, the school gained specialist sports status.

In 2008, Ellowes became the highest ranking of the three Sedgley secondary schools in GCSE examinations for the very first time when an impressive 63% of pupils finished their compulsory education with five or more grades at C or above including English and Mathematics. This placed Ellowes as the fifth highest of the Dudley Borough's 21 secondary schools.  Its success continued in 2010 with 90% of students gaining five or more grades at C and above with 66% including English and Mathematics.

Previously a foundation school administered by Dudley Metropolitan Borough Council, Ellowes Hall Sports College converted to academy status in March 2015. However the school continues to co-ordinate with Dudley Metropolitan Borough Council for admissions.

Location
The school serves the villages of Lower Gornal and Gornal Wood, where the majority of the school's pupils live. A lesser number of pupils are from the Upper Gornal area, while some are from over the border in Dudley on the Milking Bank housing estate that was mostly developed during the 1980s.

Ellowes Hall is located on the Stickley Estate, which is predominantly made up of pre-war council housing built by Sedgley UDC, though many homes have been bought off the council under the right to buy scheme. The estate is situated just to the north-west of Lower Gornal village centre, and is approximately two miles from the centres of nearby towns Sedgley and Dudley.

The majority of pupils starting at Ellowes are former pupils of Roberts Primary School, Redhall Primary School, Straits Primary School and Milking Bank Primary School, though a handful of pupils have been taken in from schools including Cotwall End Primary School and – until its closure in 2006 – Sycamore Green Primary School.

Ofsted
The latest Ofsted report in November 2012 praised the school with an 'Outstanding' award in all four categories.

Invictus Education Trust
The "Invictus Education Trust" is the academy to which Ellowes Hall, Leasowes High School, Ounsdale High School, The Crestwood School and Kinver High School are all part of. The Sixth form is governed by Mr A S Griffiths. The Invictus Trust was created in March 2015 by the founding schools: Crestwood School, Ounsdale High School, Ellowes Sports College and Kinver High School with Leasowes joining in Autumn 2016. The word Invictus was specifically chosen as the dictionary states it is ‘indomitable or unconquerable’. After creating the Education Trust, they then brought about the genesis of the 'Invictus Sixth Form' in which all of these schools involved are part of. More information about the 'Invictus Education Trust' is available here: http://www.invictus.education/.

Drama productions
The school produces plays, such as Fiddler on the Roof, miss Saigon, Billy Elliot, Oliver!, The Sound of Music, Les Misérables, and most recently The Phantom of the Opera (1986 musical)''.

Drama productions take place in the performing arts suite, which was built in 1999 at a cost of £200,000.

References

External links
School website

Schools in Dudley
Educational institutions established in 1964
Secondary schools in the Metropolitan Borough of Dudley
1964 establishments in England
Academies in the Metropolitan Borough of Dudley